Burleigh Martin (September 3, 1888 – March 23, 1962) was an American politician from Maine. A Republican from Augusta, Maine, Martin served in the Maine Legislature from his election in 1922 until 1932. From 1923–1928, Martin served in the Maine House of Representatives. From 1927–1928, Martin was the House Speaker. Elected to the Maine Senate in 1928, Martin served until 1932. During his final term (1931–1932), Martin was elected Senate President.

In 1932, Martin was the Republican nominee for Governor of Maine. He lost to Democrat Louis J. Brann. Brann was the first Democrat elected Governor of Maine since Oakley C. Curtis in 1914.

References

1888 births
1962 deaths
Politicians from Augusta, Maine
Republican Party members of the Maine House of Representatives
Presidents of the Maine Senate
Republican Party Maine state senators
20th-century American politicians